Plagiodontia is a genus of rodent in the subfamily Capromyinae (hutias). All known species are endemic to the Caribbean island of Hispaniola (in the present-day Dominican Republic and Haiti).

Systematics
This genus contains the following three species (two of them extinct):
 Hispaniolan hutia (Plagiodontia aedium) F. Cuvier, 1836
† Samaná hutia (Plagiodontia ipnaeum) Johnson, 1948
† Plagiodontia spelaeum Miller, 1929

Phylogeny
Within Capromyidae, Plagiodontia is the deepest branching genus, belonging to the tribe Plagiodontini. It is the sister group to the other genera Geocapromys, Mesocapromys, Mysateles and  Capromys, all belonging to the tribe Capromyini.

References

 
Hutias
Rodent genera
Taxa named by Frédéric Cuvier
Taxonomy articles created by Polbot